The genus Zanda has three species of cockatoos. They are all mostly black in colour, and the taxa may be differentiated partly by size and partly by small areas of red, grey, and yellow plumage, especially in the tail feathers.

The genus Zanda was introduced in 1913 by the Australian born ornithologist Gregory Mathews with Baudin's black cockatoo as the type species. Matthews provided no explanation for the etymology but it is possibly an aboriginal name.

Species 
The genus contains three species.

References

Further reading

 

 
Bird genera